Hamdi Jobi Akujobi (born 20 January 2000) is a Dutch professional footballer who plays as a right-back for Eerste Divisie club Almere City.

Professional career
On 25 April 2019, Akujobi signed his first professional contract with SC Heerenveen for three years. Akujobi made his professional debut with Heerenven in a 4–0 Eredivisie win over Heracles Almelo on 4 August 2019.

Akujobi joined Eerste Divisie club Almere City on 10 July 2022, signing a two-year contract with an option for an additional year.

International career
Born in the Netherlands, Akujobi is of Nigerian descent. He was called up for the preliminary Nigeria national under-20 football team for the 2019 FIFA U-20 World Cup.

References

External links
 
 

2000 births
Living people
Footballers from Rotterdam
Citizens of Nigeria through descent
Nigerian footballers
Nigeria youth international footballers
Dutch footballers
Dutch people of Nigerian descent
Association football defenders
SC Heerenveen players
Almere City FC players
Eredivisie players